The Pocahontas was one of the named passenger trains of the Norfolk and Western Railway. It was an overnight train between Norfolk, Virginia, and Cincinnati, Ohio, with a through-car to and from Chicago, Illinois. The Pocahontas ran from November 1926 until May 1971.

Westbound Train 3 left Norfolk at 2:40 p.m. and arrived at Cincinnati at 7:35 a.m., while the eastbound Train 4 left Cincinnati at 11:25 p.m. and arrived back at Norfolk at 5:10 p.m. A connection was made in Portsmouth, Ohio, with the Columbus District passenger trains 33 and 34.

The train carried two 10-roomette-6-double-bedroom sleeping cars from Norfolk to Cincinnati, one of which went through to Chicago on train 71 of the Pennsylvania Railroad. Pocahontas also handled a Winston-Salem to Columbus 10-6 sleeping car that was carried in train 12 from Winston-Salem to Roanoke, train 3 from Roanoke to Portsmouth, and train 33 from Portsmouth to Columbus. All those trains had counterparts operating in the opposite directions.

The most famous engines to power the Pocahontas were the class J steam locomotives. They were the pride of the N&W, pulling crack passenger trains such as the Cavalier, the Powhatan Arrow, and the Pocahontas, as well as ferrying the Southern Railway's Tennessean between Lynchburg, Virginia, and Bristol, Virginia. One test proved that a class J could pull 15 cars at 100 m.p.h. along one section of flat, straight track in eastern Virginia. The only surviving unit of the J class is No. 611.

In April 1946 the N&W ordered sufficient passenger cars to re-equip the Pocohontas partially and the Powhatan Arrow completely. The new cars for the Pocahontas included ten 56-seat coaches (P3 class #531–540), two 36-seat dining cars (D1 class, #493 General William Mahone and #494 Frederick J. Kimball), three 10-roomette-6-double bedroom cars from Pullman-Standard (S2 class), and 20 similar cars from Budd (S1 class). Some of the P3 and two more D1 cars (#491–492) were for the Powhatan Arrow, and the sleeping cars, which were all named after colleges and counties in Virginia, were used on all N&W sleeping-car trains.

The cars were delivered in 1949. They were smooth-sided and were delivered in Tuscan Red and Black; even the stainless-steel Budd cars were painted, and they lacked the usual fluted sides. Of the ten P3 cars, eight may still be in operation. Several of those cars were used in the Norfolk Southern Steam Program.  The N&W streamlined/lightweight trains were originally painted as follows: sides, ends, and skirts ("Tuscan Red"), roofs ("Dark Brown"), with Trucks ("Pullman Green") and lettering/striping ("Gold Leaf").

Around the early 1950s the lettering/striping was changed to imitation gold.  The roofs, when repainted in the '50s, changed to black, as were the trucks. The heavyweights were painted the same but did not carry train-name logos or striping. N&W adopted blue at the end of 1965, but the repaints were not all done right away.

May 1, 1971, marked the final run for N&W train 4, the eastbound Pocahontas; it was also N&W's last regularly scheduled passenger train.

Major stops
Norfolk Terminal Station
Petersburg Union Station
Lynchburg
Roanoke
Christiansburg station
Bluefield, West Virginia
Portsmouth, Ohio
Cincinnati Union Terminal

Branch service from Petersburg to Richmond; branch service from Portsmouth to Columbus, Ohio

Derailments
 On January 23, 1956, class J No. 611 derailed along the Tug River near Cedar, Mingo County, West Virginia while pulling the Pocahontas. It was determined that the engineer ran the engine at an excessive speed around a curve and its high center of gravity caused it to flip on its side. No. 611 was repaired and continued revenue passenger service. It was retired in 1959 and purchased by the Virginia Museum of Transportation, which restored it to operational condition in 2015.

References

Passenger trains of the Norfolk and Western Railway
Named passenger trains of the United States
Railway services introduced in 1941
1971 disestablishments in the United States
Night trains of the United States
Passenger rail transportation in Ohio
Passenger rail transportation in Virginia
Passenger rail transportation in Washington, D.C.
Passenger rail transportation in West Virginia
Railway services discontinued in 1971